Espen Barth Eide (born 1 May 1964, in Oslo) is a Norwegian politician and political scientist. He is currently serving as the Minister of Climate and the Environment in Jonas Gahr Støre's government. He has been a been a member of the Norwegian Parliament since 2017, representing the Labour Party. He was elected to this seat in the 2017 election, and reelected in the 2021 election. From 2017 to 2021, Eide was the Labour Party's spokesperson for Energy, Climate and Environment.

On 22 August 2014, Barth Eide was appointed United Nations Special Adviser on Cyprus by former UN Secretary-General Ban Ki-moon. He continued in this capacity under current Secretary-General António Guterres until 14 August 2017, when he stepped down from his UN role in order to engage in the election campaign in Norway.  

From 2014 to 2016 he served as managing director and member of the Managing Board at the World Economic Forum in Geneva.

Barth Eide served as Norway's Minister of Defence in Stoltenberg's Second Cabinet from 2011 to 2012, and subsequently as Minister of Foreign Affairs until 2013. Since December 2013, Barth Eide has served as a member of the Board of the Centre for Humanitarian Dialogue (HD). He was chair of the Board until 14 October 2021. He was a member of the boards of Stockholm International Peace Research Institute (SIPRI) and the Norwegian Atlantic Committee until the same date.

Early life and education

Eide is the son of the jurist, human rights expert, and author Asbjørn Eide (b. 1933) and Professor of nutritional physiology Wenche Barth Eide (b. Barth 1935). He attended the Oslo Cathedral School and graduated from the University of Oslo in 1993 with a cand.polit. degree. He also studied at the Autonomous University of Barcelona.

Eide joined the Labour Party in 1979 and in the 1980s held several positions in AUF (Labour Party Youth). He was secretary-general of the European Movement Norway in 1992-1993 and had a key role in the campaign for Norwegian membership in the EU in 1994.

Norwegian Institute of International Affairs (NUPI)
In 1993, Eide began working as a researcher in the United Nations Program at the Norwegian Institute of International Affairs (NUPI). He became Head of this program in 1996, later working as an advisor to the panel on Threats, Challenges and Change and the Report on Integrated Missions. In 2002 he became the head of NUPI's Department of International Politics, a position he held until he returned to Government in 2005.

Political career
During Jens Stoltenberg's first term as Prime Minister, from 2000 to 2001, Eide served as a State Secretary at the Ministry of Foreign Affairs. When the Stoltenberg's second cabinet took office after the 2005 election, Eide became a State Secretary at the Ministry of Foreign Affairs. In 2010, he again served as a State Secretary at the Ministry of Foreign Affairs. On 11 November 2011, he was appointed to the post of Minister of Defence. On 21 September 2012, he was appointed to the post of Minister of Foreign Affairs, succeeding Jonas Gahr Støre.

After the resignation of Jens Stoltenberg's Government in October 2013, following the 2013 election, he temporarily left Norwegian politics, but returned to Norway and was elected as Member of Parliament for the Oslo Labour Party in the 2017 election. He was re-elected in 2021.

From 2001 to 2013, Eide was a member of the Presidency of the Party of European Socialists. In 2004, he led a policy review on integrated missions commissioned by the UN Secretariat. He also served as adviser to the High-Level Panel on UN Reform, which concluded its work in 2005. He has also been active in the World Economic Forum since 2003, and a regular attendee of the Munich Security Conference since 2006.

Minister of Defence
Eide was appointed as defence minister by Prime Minister Jens Stoltenberg on 11 November 2011 after Grete Faremo was appointed minister of justice. Eide described his new position as "a great responsibility" and said he would not make "revolutionary changes".

In March 2012, Eide criticized NATO Secretary-General Anders Fogh Rasmussens for saying that he was open to the possibility of using information gained under torture. Eide pronounced this "unacceptable", saying that it violated international conventions.

Eide recognized that Norway's purchase of fighter jets would reduce the amount of funding available for other purposes .

In June 2012, Eide made the opening remarks at a seminar in Oslo on "Masculinity and the Military", saying that Norway was beginning the "final stage of the transformation of the armed forces", taking "a fundamentally new approach to how we recruit, invest in and maintain a pool of highly qualified personnel." In addition to "recruiting those who can run long distances and carry a heavy back pack", he explained, the military would seek to "attract those who are especially skilled in new technologies. Young people who can make an impact on system and strategy thinking. Indeed we need women and men who are inclined to find cyberspace more fascinating than wildlife and hiking."

On 11 September 2012, Eide delivered a speech marking the end of Norway's involvement in the war in Afghanistan.

Minister of Foreign Affairs

2012
Prime Minister Stoltenberg named Eide Minister of Foreign Affairs on 21 September 2012 in a cabinet reshuffle.

Eide gave an extensive interview to Der Spiegel in October 2012 about the responsible exploitation of Arctic resources.

Asked in December 2012 about the EU's growing economic crisis, Eide said, "I believe the answer is more Europe. Less Europe or some kind of disintegration is not just wrong, but it can in fact be quite dangerous." If countries abandon the EU, he said, it cannot "bring peace in Europe or a visible Europe in the global arena."

In December 2012, Eide urged the United Kingdom to remain in the EU. The next month, asked whether Britain would be better off in the EEA rather than in the EU, Eide underscored that it would be best for the EU if Britain left its status unchanged: "As a historic and current close ally of Norway, I think we see more advantages in Britain still being a part of the EU in the future, so that British pragmatism on many issues has a seat at the table when important issues are discussed."

2013
At an Arctic Frontiers conference in Tromsø in January 2013, Eide signed a Host Country Agreement between Norway and the Arctic Council, establishing a permanent secretariat for the council in that city.

At a joint press conference on 12 March 2013 in Washington, D.C., with newly appointed U.S. Secretary of State John Kerry, Eide said that Norway was working "closely with the Syrian opposition", by providing humanitarian aid and, "trying to help them to set up local council inside Syria." But Norway, like the U.S., was not yet, "actively arming the rebels", though it agreed with the U.S. that "President Assad has lost all credibility, he must go. We need to work with the Syrian opposition, we need to help them to unify, we need to help them to consolidate messages, and we need to make sure that the Security Council finally is able to come to a kind of joint position in this issue. And I think on these issues we are very much of the same approach."

In March 2013, Eide addressed the first-ever governmental conference on the humanitarian consequences of nuclear weapons. "Time is not on our side", he told the audience. "The technology exists, on more hands, and we know that more states and non-state groups are contemplating acquiring real weapons. On top of this, comes the risk of accidental detonation, for instance due to improper handling of nuclear weapons."

In April 2013, Eide declared that a new wave of violence in the state of Rakhine in Burma should not be considered identical to earlier conflicts in that country, which resulted from government oppression. He expressed confidence that Burmese authorities were taking the situation seriously and were eager to establish reconciliation and peace.

Eide hailed the "historic agreement" between Serbia and Kosovo in April 2013 which resolved all outstanding questions between the two countries. Meeting with Serbian First Deputy Prime Minister Aleksandar Vučić in Belgrade, Eide said that even though Norway is not a member of the EU, it strongly supports Serbia's EU pathway.

Minister of Climate and the Environment

2021
On 14 October 2021, Eide was appointed Minister of Climate and the Environment in Støre's Cabinet.

Barth Eide and Minister of Trade and Industry Jan Christian Vestre announced that the government would work actively to cut emissions, with him saying: "We must dispose of the emissions we have left in the best possible way. We will look for the most rational, cost-effective and efficient measures that reduce emissions in all sectors of society".

Ahead of the 2021 United Nations Climate Change Conference, Barth Eide expressed hopes to make substantial progress regarding discussions about the Paris climate agreement's article 6. He also said that he wanted to assist in finding a solution to the quota trading.

Barth Eide expressed that an overview over climate emissions from consumption could be necessary. He further said it was something Norway should become better at, but couldn't yet say when such a process would be started. However, he did reassure that it would be started gradually over time.

Early into the 2021 United Nations Climate Change Conference in Glasgow, Barth Eide said it was also too early to say if any significant progress could be made. He did however stress the importance of the work against climate change and putting 1,5 degrees as a target for the world to reach. He also advised that money that goes to climate adaption should be tripled.

Barth Eide stated that Greta Thunberg's statements of the seriousness of the climate crisis were acceptable, but he further warned that saying that the policies and the conference being useless, would be heading down a dangerous path. He further added a message to Thunberg and her supporters: "I believe that the strong and sensible commitment to make something happen must be converted into political action, not into rejecting the whole idea of democratic political change. It's a bit important to get that balance in order there, and that is my message to Greta Thunberg and those who cheer her on".

In late November, Eide approved the culling of 26 wolves living in various parts of Norway. On the issue, he commented: "The Ministry of Climate and the Environment has dealt with complaints about the predatory game committees' decisions on licensing of up to 26 wolves outside the wolf zone. We have not found grounds to change the decision. They are therefore final". The wolves are a critical endangered species in Norway.

2022
Barth Eide received criticism from the Socialist Left Party in January 2022 after having spoken "warmly" about the country's oil and gas industry in a meeting with the European Union's Commissioner for Climate Action Frans Timmermans. The party's spokesperson for climate policy, Lars Haltbrekken, stated that his party "fears that fossil gas will displace renewable and emission-free energy". He also indicated that the party would question Barth Eide about the matter, and to "get him to realise that fossil energy is not the solution, not even in a temporary period". Barth Eide responded to the criticism, saying: "In an ideal world, one should really say that only completely green things are green. But part of the problem with taxonomy is that everything has to be green at once. Then you will not catch the transition from brown to green, which the gas can be if it replaces coal, but which it is not if it replaces wind. As long as you aim for zero emissions in the end, then this is a natural part of the way there".

Barth Eide and his predecessor, Sveinung Rotevatn, both agreed that Norwegian politicians hasn't done enough to fight against climate change. Either he or Rotevatn expressed that the 1,5 target wasn't impossible to reach, although it could be difficult.

In response to a joint letter from governors and mayors from the area surrounding the Oslo fjord regarding nitrogen pollution, Barth Eide responded saying that he appreciated the enthusiasm regarding the issue. He also promised to meet the effected local leaders regarding measures to strengthen nitrogen purification and solutions to other issues mentioned in the letter.

In early February, Eide announced that the government had won in the appeal court against a temporary injunction to further cull 26 wolves inside the designated wolf zone. The culling of the wolves started the very next day, bringing the Norwegian wolf even closer to extinction.

After the Centre Party's parliamentary leader Marit Arnstad had suggested that Norway's climate good may have to be pushed back, Eide responded, saying that they would not do so. He also stated that going back on climate ambitions was not the way forward, but instead opt to maintain them and or strengthen them. He also noted that the strategy to reach said targets were not specific, but the goal is binding. Eide also didn't rule out tightening the grip on the climate goal.

On 30 May, he announced the establishment of a new environmental council, which would only be so in name, and would officially be a "council for fair workplace adjustment". The intended purpose is for workers and their employers to offer solutions. Barth Eide stated: "This applies to steel and smelters, it applies to cement production and heavy industry. We must come up with solutions for chemical processes and new energy sources to manage this, together". Although environmental groups expressed understanding for the inclusion of workers and employers, they were critical of being left out, despite having previously been invited to similar councils to either negotiate or handle questions of political solutions. The leader of the Norwegian Society for the Conservation of Nature, Truls Gulowsen, said: "Of course, we agree that the labour partners should have a central role, but this does not preclude others from being involved, especially if the council is to have real significance in the work with record-breaking emission cuts".

On 22 June, it was announced that the government would establish protection over Lopphavet, making it the largest ocean protected area in the country. Eide stated: "We have targeted the protection measures against the natural values ​​that were important to protect". Despite the ocean's protection, fishing would still be allowed in it, to which he said: "It will have little effect on the activity that is there today. We have received great local support for the measure". The only exception would be two coral areas. The protection of the area would be headed by the municipalities of Alta, Hasvik and Loppa, along with Troms og Finnmark county and the Sámi Parliament of Norway.

While attending the United Nations ocean conference on 27 June, Barth Eide announced that the Norwegian government would be establishing an ocean environmental law. The law would allow the government to establish protection areas reaching up to 200 nautical miles. He said: "Once we have the law in place, we can establish protection in all of the sea Norway manages. This is closely linked to what Norway and the UN want. We must become better at managing the sea in a sustainable way".

In August, Barth Eide expressed disagreement with fellow party member Trond Giske over the government's plan to develop new renewable power in Norway before regulating the relationship with foreign exports. Barth Eide expressed that he believed that electricity might continue to be expensive and that there was no reason "to believe it would become less expensive immediately".

On 29 August, Dagbladet revealed that Barth Eide and his ministry had rejected a request from Ukraine regarding the need for personal protective equipment for rangers in the country. The rejection letter stated that Norway didn't have the equipment in question available for donation.

On 6 October, as part of the state budget for 2023, Barth Eide presented plans to tackle climate change in what he dubbed "the green book". The budget included plans to cut emissions from 23,9 million tons to 23,2 million, while additional measures would assist it being fill the gap of 0,2 million. Environmental organisations reacted widely negative to the budget proposal for climate and environment issues, citing the cuts weren't sufficient enough to reach Norway's climate goal in 2030.

In early November, Liberal Party leader Guri Melby accused Barth Eide of hiding the real figures for car emissions in a Norwegian Automobile Federation report. State Secretary Ragnhild Syrstad, on Barth Eide's behalf, assured that process was being made on selling electricity cars and reach the 2025 goal.

While attending the 2022 United Nations Climate Change Conference in Egypt, Eide defended Norway's position on confusing to produce oil while also calling for increased climate costs. He added that he wasn't impressed by the notion of stopping oil production and the sudden occurrence of an energy revolution, also that oil among other things, should be phased out gradually.

Eide attended the 2022 United Nations Biodiversity Conference in Montreal, where he encouraged cooperation between countries to solve the nature crisis. He also led the end-negotiations at the conference and also expressed hope for a solution by the end of its duration. On 19 December, a nature agreement was made by all countries at the conference. Barth Eide praised the agreement, also praising it for its "clear language". The agreement had however been blocked by DR Congo before being ratified.

2023
In January 2023, Barth Eide was a part of a Norwegian delegation visiting the Troll Research Station in Antarctica. He also announced that the government had tasked the Norwegian Directorate of Public Construction and Property to consider building new facilities for the research station worth 3 billion NOK, with a doubling capacity for 65 to 100 people.

Chair of the Board, Centre for Humanitarian Dialogue
In December 2013, Eide joined the Board of the Centre for Humanitarian Dialogue (HD), a private diplomacy organisation whose mission is to help mitigate armed violence through dialogue and mediation. Since 2016 he was Vice Chair and from June 2019, he has been the chair of the Board of the Centre for Humanitarian Dialogue. He resigned from this post when he was appointed minister on 14 October 2021.

Board memberships, SIPRI and The Norwegian Atlantic Committee 
Eide was a member of the board of the Stockholm International Peace Research Institute (SIPRI) from 2017 to 2021, and was a board member of the Norwegian Institute of International Affairs (NUPI) from 2014 to 2017. From 2017 to 2021, he was a member of the Board of the Norwegian Atlantic Committee and a member of the European Leadership Network (ELN) in London.

Special Adviser for Cyprus
In 2014, he was appointed UN Secretary-General Ban Ki-moon's Special Adviser for Cyprus. As a UN Under-Secretary General, Eide led the United Nations Good Offices Mission in Cyprus for three years. In 2016, after two years of intensified negotiations and liaison, he stated that both sides are strongly committed to the peace process and that settlement discussions are held without taboos on all issues. He was reappointed in this position by Secretary General António Guterres in 2017. An International Conference on Cyprus was inaugurated on 12 January 2017 in Geneva, but closed without having arrived at a final settlement at its last session in Crans-Montana, Switzerland, on 6 July 2017.

On 14 August 2017, he announced his resignation as UN special envoy to Cyprus in order to run for elected office in Norway. A new Special Adviser has so far not been appointed and negotiations have not resumed.

Personal life
Barth Eide is married and has three sons. He met his wife in the late 1980s in Barcelona, when they were both active in the European Movement. His oldest son was at Utøya at the time of the 2011 Norway attacks, and ultimately survived it.

References

External links

Regjeringen.no biography 

|-

1964 births
Living people
Foreign Ministers of Norway
Labour Party (Norway) politicians
Ministers of Climate and the Environment of Norway
Norwegian political scientists
Norwegian state secretaries
People educated at Oslo Cathedral School
University of Oslo alumni
Defence ministers of Norway